Swan is an English surname. Notable people with the surname include:

Academics
 Daniel C. Swan, American cultural anthropologist and museum curator
 Donald A. Swan (1935–1981), American anthropologist
 Janis Swan, American-New Zealand food process engineering academic
 Richard Swan (born 1933), American mathematician
 Toril Swan (born 1945), Norwegian philologist
 Trevor Swan (1918-1989), Australian economist
 Vivien Swan (1943-2009), British archaeologist

Arts, entertainment, and literature
 Alfred Swan (1890–1970), Russian composer and musicologist
 Alison Swan (fl. 1988–2015), Bermudian filmmaker, writer, and real estate developer
 Annalyn Swan (born c. 1951), American writer
 Anni Swan (1875–1958), Finnish writer
 Astrid Swan (1982–), Finnish musician and singer
 Barbara Swan (1922–2003), American artist
 Curt Swan (1920–1996), American comics artist
 Erinn Swan (born 1984), Australian singer, songwriter, and performer
 Fred Swan, American painter
 Hash Swan (born 1995), South Korean rapper
 Jon Swan (fl. 2010), American poet, playwright, librettist, journalist, and editor
 Jonathan Swan (fl. 2014–2018), Australian journalist
 Kal Swan (born 1963), Scottish–born vocalist
 Kitty Swan (born 1943), Danish actress
 Lucile Swan American sculptor and painter
 Nathaniel Walter Swan (1834–1884), Irish-born Australian writer
 Serinda Swan (born 1984), Canadian actress

Politics
 Almon Swan (1819–1883), member of the Wisconsin State Assembly, United States
 Andrew Swan (born 1968), politician in Manitoba, Canada
 Benjamin Swan (fl. 2013–2014), state legislator, Massachusetts, United States
 Denise Swan (born 1947), Australian politician
 George Swan (politician) (1833–1913), New Zealand businessman and Member of Parliament
 Herbert Swan (1869–1949), Australian trade unionist and politician
 Wayne Swan (1954–), Australian politician, Treasurer of Australia (2007–2013)
 Yvonne Swan (born 1943), Sinixt Native American activist, and a once convicted criminal.

Sports
 Adrian Swan (1932–2006), Australian figure skater
 Chris Swan (born 1978), Australian cricketer
 Chris Swan (footballer) (1900–1979), English footballer
 Craig Swan (born 1950), American baseball pitcher
 Dane Swan (born 1984), Australian footballer
 Derek Swan (born 1966), Irish footballer
 Fred H. Swan (1902–1993), American football player and coach
 Gavin Swan (born 1970), Australian cricketer
 George Swan (footballer) (born 1994), English footballer
 Glenn Swan (born 1952), Australian rules footballer                      
 Graeme Swan, retired English spinner
 Harry Swan (1887–1946), American baseball pitcher
 Henry Swan (cricketer) (1879–1941), English cricketer
 Ian Swan (1930–2004), Scottish international rugby union player
 Isabel Swan (1983–), Brazilian sailor
 Katie Swan (born 1999), British tennis player
 Raymond Swan (born 1938), Bermudian long-distance runner

Other people
 Bill or Billy Swan, see William Swan (disambiguation)
 Carole Swan (fl. 2007–2011), Canadian public servant, President of the Canadian Food Inspection Agency
 Charles Swan (disambiguation)
 Charlie Swan (disambiguation)
 Conrad Swan (born 1924), officer of arms at the College of Arms, London, England
 Guy Swan (born 1954), United States Army Lft. general
 Henry Harrison Swan (1840–1916), United States federal judge
 Hepzibah Swan (died 1825), American heiress, married to James Swan (financier)
 James Swan (disambiguation)
 Jeremy Swan (1922–2005), Irish cardiologist
 Jimmy Swan, see James Swan (disambiguation)
 John Swan (disambiguation)
 Joseph Swan (disambiguation)
 Peter Swan (disambiguation)
 William Swan (disambiguation)

Fictional characters
 Bella Swan, from the Twilight series
 Emma Swan, from the U.S. television series Once Upon a Time
 Elizabeth Swan, from ‘’Pirates of the Caribbean’’

See also
 Johannes Ambundii de Swan (1384–1424), a German ecclesiastic
 Swan (disambiguation)
 Swann (disambiguation)

English-language surnames